Orissi, also spelled Odissi ( oṛiśī) is an adjectival form of Odisha. It may refer to:
Odissi dance, the classical dance of Odisha
Orissi music, the classical music of Odisha
other aspects of Orissi culture
a person from Odisha